The Byram Township School District is a comprehensive community public school district that serves students in pre-kindergarten through eighth grade from Byram Township, in Sussex County, New Jersey, United States.

As of the 2017–18 school year, the district and its two schools had an enrollment of 843 students and 87.0 classroom teachers (on an FTE basis), for a student–teacher ratio of 9.7:1.

The district is classified by the New Jersey Department of Education as being in District Factor Group "I", the second-highest of eight groupings. District Factor Groups organize districts statewide to allow comparison by common socioeconomic characteristics of the local districts. From lowest socioeconomic status to highest, the categories are A, B, CD, DE, FG, GH, I and J.

For public school students in ninth through twelfth grades, the township shares Lenape Valley Regional High School, which also serves Netcong in Morris County and the Sussex County community of Stanhope. As of the 2017–18 school year, the high school had an enrollment of 706 students and 60.0 classroom teachers (on an FTE basis), for a student–teacher ratio of 11.8:1. Students from Byram Township had attended Sparta High School until 1974, when the Lenape Valley district was created.

Schools
Schools in the district (with 2017-18 enrollment data from the National Center for Education Statistics) are:
Elementary school
Byram Lakes Elementary School with 440 students in grades PreK - 4
Middle school
Byram Intermediate School with 400 students in grades 5 - 8

Administration
Core members of the district's administration are:
Bryan Hensz, Superintendent
Alice Bresett, Business Administrator / Board Secretary

The district's board of education has seven members who set policy and oversee the fiscal and educational operation of the district through its administration. As a Type II school district, the board's trustees are elected directly by voters to serve three-year terms of office on a staggered basis, with either two or three seats up for election each year held (since 2012) as part of the November general election.

References

External links
Byram Township School District
 
Byram Township School District, National Center for Education Statistics
Lenape Valley Regional High School

Byram Township, New Jersey
New Jersey District Factor Group I
School districts in Sussex County, New Jersey